Ayala Malls Manila Bay (formerly Ayala Malls Bay Area) is a shopping mall in Metro Manila, developed by Ayala Malls, a wholly owned subsidiary of Ayala Corporation. Opened on September 26, 2019, it is the first Ayala Mall in Parañaque. It is located in the Aseana City township development, close to PAGCOR's Entertainment City and archrival mall SM Mall of Asia in Bay City.

Features

The mall features a 1-hectare Central Garden and ten digital cinemas, the biggest among Ayala Malls, including an A-Giant Screen cinema & A-Luxe Recliner Seats for select cinemas. The mall also hosts multiple entertainment and leisure facilities including the then-largest Timezone branch in the country, at 2,000 square meters. 

Ayala Malls Manila Bay has four dedicated country-specific shopping sections, the Filipino Village, China Town, Japan Town and Korea Town. It will be anchored by The Landmark Department Store and Supermarket, opening on 2023.

Located at the fourth floor of the mall, Express Lingkod Office (ELO) Serbisyo Center is the one-stop-shop service center, bringing under one roof both personal and business frontline services of the Parañaque City Government.

Events 
 Actor Henry Cavill visited the mall to promote The Witcher in a fan meeting on December 12, 2019.

External links
Ayala Malls Manila Bay Official website

References

Shopping malls in Metro Manila
Buildings and structures in Parañaque
Ayala Malls
Shopping malls established in 2019
2019 establishments in the Philippines